Hargurdeep Saini (Punjabi: ਹਰਗੁਰਦੀਪ ਸੈਣੀ), also known as Deep Saini, is a scientist, incoming Principal and Vice-Chancellor of McGill University.

Career
Hargurdeep Saini was previously the President and Vice-Chancellor of Dalhousie University, a Vice-Chancellor and President of University of Canberra, a vice-president of University of Toronto, and principal of the university's Mississauga campus, and dean of the Faculty of Environment at the University of Waterloo in Waterloo, Ontario. Saini became a noted plant physiologist and served as director general of the Plant Biology Research Institute in Montreal before moving into university administration.  

On 14 November 2022, it was announced that Deep Saini will step down from his role as president of Dalhousie, effective 31 December 2022, to become Principal and Vice-Chancellor of McGill University.

References

Canadian people of Indian descent
Punjabi people
Living people
Canadian physiologists
Academic staff of the University of Toronto
Plant physiologists
Canadian molecular biologists
Indian molecular biologists
Academic staff of the University of Canberra
University of Adelaide alumni
University of Alberta alumni
Academic staff of the University of Waterloo
Scientists from Ontario
20th-century Indian scientists
21st-century Indian scientists
20th-century Canadian scientists
21st-century Canadian scientists
Punjab Agricultural University people
Indian physiologists
Year of birth missing (living people)